Uturunku (Quechua for jaguar, Hispanicized spelling Otorunco) is a mountain in the Wansu mountain range  in the Andes of Peru, about  high. It is situated in the Cusco Region, Chumbivilcas Province, Santo Tomás District. Uturunku is surrounded by the mountains Chankuwaña, Wamanripa and Waytani in the northwest, east and southwest.

References 

Mountains of Peru
Mountains of Cusco Region